Richard Zoglin (born August 8, 1948) is an American journalist and author.

Zoglin wrote about  entertainment for Time for over 20 years. He is the author of Hope: Entertainer of the Century, a 2014 biography of comedian Bob Hope.

In 2008, he published Comedy at the Edge: How Stand-up in the 1970s Changed America, describing Lenny Bruce and the influence of the generation of stand-ups who followed him and elaborated on his style.

Education
Zoglin obtained a bachalor's degree from the University of California, Berkeley, where he later received his master's degree in journalism.

Family
Zoglin was married to Charla Krupp on August 1, 1992, until her death from breast cancer on January 23, 2012. Charla Zoglin was an entertainment editor for Glamour. Zoglin's father was the head of Zoglin Brothers Builders in Kansas City.

Works 
 

Elvis in Vegas:  How the King Reinvented the Las Vegas Show

References

1948 births
20th-century American journalists
American male journalists
20th-century American male writers
21st-century American biographers
21st-century American journalists
21st-century American male writers
Living people
Place of birth missing (living people)
Time (magazine) people
UC Berkeley Graduate School of Journalism alumni